German submarine U-132 was a Type VIIC U-boat built for Nazi Germany's Kriegsmarine for service during World War II. She was laid down on 10 August 1940 by Vegesacker Werft, Bremen-Vegesack as yard number 11, launched on 10 April 1941 and commissioned on 29 May that year under Kapitänleutnant Ernst Vogelsang.

She was a member of three wolfpacks. The submarine was lost after an attack on Convoy SC-107 in November 1942.

Design
German Type VIIC submarines were preceded by the shorter Type VIIB submarines. U-132 had a displacement of  when at the surface and  while submerged. She had two shafts and two  propellers.

U-132 was fitted with five  torpedo tubes (four fitted at the bow and one at the stern), fourteen torpedoes, one  SK C/35 naval gun, 220 rounds, and a  C/30 anti-aircraft gun. The boat had a complement of between forty-four and sixty.

Service history

First patrol
U-132 departed on her first patrol when she left Trondheim in Norway on 7 September 1941. Rounding the North Cape, she criss-crossed that part of the Barents Sea northwest of Murmansk before heading further east. She sank two Soviet ships, Argun and SKR-11 Ural on 18 October.

The boat docked in Kirkenes, also in Norway, on 21 October.

Second patrol
Having moved from Kirkenes back to Trondheim in late October 1941, U-132 commenced her second foray on 15 January 1942. Here she sank  on the 29th.

She then moved to the port of La Pallice in occupied France, arriving on 8 February.

Third patrol
The boat's most successful patrol began when she left La Pallice on 10 June 1942. Having crossed the Atlantic Ocean, she attacked shipping in the Gulf of St Lawrence. 

On 6 July the U-132 sank 3 ships in short order, Anastasios Pateras, Hainaut and Dinaric, all southeast of Cap Chat, Quebec from convoy QS-15. The convoy escort  the Canadian minesweeper  retaliated with a depth charge attack. The warship's depth charges damaged the U-boat's ballast pumps and resulted in the loss of 4 m³ of fuel. 

Fourteen days later on 20 July, the submarine attacked Frederika Lensen in convoy QS-19 near Anticosti Island. The ship was towed to Grand Valée Bay and beached, but with her back broken, she was declared a total loss.

On 29 July the U-132 sights convoy ON-113 and the next day sinks one ship from it.

The boat returned to La Pallice on 16 August.

Fourth patrol and loss
U-132 left La Pallice for the last time on 6 October 1942. All 47 crew members died; there were no survivors.

Wolfpacks
U-132 took part in three wolfpacks, namely:
 Endrass (12 – 17 June 1942) 
 Panther (13 – 19 October 1942) 
 Veilchen (20 October - 3 November 1942)

Previously recorded fate
Had originally been recorded as sunk the next day, 5 November 1942, by British aircraft of No. 120 Squadron RAF. The 120 Squadron attack, in the same area southeast of Cape Farewell where U-132 inadvertently sunk herself, had actually been on  operating nearby, causing severe damage but not sinking her.

Summary of raiding history

*Credit for sinking this vessel belongs to U-442

References

Bibliography

External links

German Type VIIC submarines
World War II submarines of Germany
U-boat accidents
U-boats commissioned in 1941
U-boats sunk in 1942
1941 ships
Shipwrecks in the Atlantic Ocean
Ships built in Bremen (state)
Ships lost with all hands
Maritime incidents in November 1942